The Portuguese Basketball Super Cup is a men's professional basketball competition in Portugal (Portuguese: "Supertaça de Portugal de Basquetebol") and it is played by the champions of the Portuguese league and the winners of the Portuguese Cup. It is a super cup competition. Benfica have won a record 14 trophies.

Winners

Performance by club

References

SuperCup, Portuguese Basketball
Basketball supercup competitions in Europe
1984 establishments in Portugal
Recurring sporting events established in 1984